Cycloloma is a monotypic genus which contains the sole species Cycloloma atriplicifolium, which is known by the common names winged pigweed, tumble ringwing, plains tumbleweed,  and tumble-weed. This plant is native to central North America, but it is spreading and has been occasionally reported in far-flung areas from California to Maine to the Canadian prairie. It is considered an introduced species outside of central North America. This is a bushy annual herb forming a rounded pale green clump which may exceed  in height. It is very intricately branched, with toothed leaves occurring near the base. The spreading stems bear widely spaced flowers are small immature fruits fringed with a nearly transparent membranous wing.  In autumn, the plant forms a tumbleweed.  The fruit is a utricle about 2 millimeters long containing a single seed.

Uses 
The seeds are eaten as a food staple by Native American peoples including the Zuni and Hopi. The Zuni people mix the seeds with  ground corn to make a mush. The Zuni also grind the seeds, mix them with corn meal and make them into steamed cakes. The Zuni also chew the blossoms and rub them all over the hands for protection.

References

External links 

Jepson Manual Treatment
USDA Plants Profile
Photo gallery
  Cycloloma atriplicifolium  - Online, In: Flora of North America Editorial Committee (Hrsg.): Flora of North America North of Mexico, Volume 4: Magnoliophyta: Caryophyllidae, part 1., Oxford University Press, New York, p. 265.
 Cycloloma atriplicifolium at Tropicos

Chenopodioideae
Amaranthaceae genera
Monotypic Caryophyllales genera
Flora of Canada
Flora of the Eastern United States
Flora of the Western United States
Plants used in Native American cuisine
Taxa named by John Merle Coulter
Tumbleweeds
Flora without expected TNC conservation status